is a passenger railway station located in the city of Fussa, Tokyo, Japan, operated by East Japan Railway Company (JR East).

Lines 
Kumagawa Station is served by the Itsukaichi Line, and is located 1.1 kilometers from the starting point of the line at Haijima Station.

Station layout 
This station consists of a single side platform serving a single bi-directional track,  connected to the station building by a footbridge. The station is unattended.

Platform

History
The station opened as a temporary stop on 28 May 1931, and was upgraded to a full passenger station on 30 October 1931. With the privatization of Japanese National Railways (JNR) on 1 April 1987, the station came under the control of JR East.

Passenger statistics
In fiscal 2010, the station was used by an average of 1,477 passengers daily (boarding passengers only).

Surrounding area
 Kumagawa Post Office
 Kumagaya Jinja

See also
 List of railway stations in Japan

References

External links

  Hyperdia.com train schedule search engine
  East Japan Rail Way Company (JR East) Official Website
  JR East Train Routes Map
  Haijima Station (JR East) 

Railway stations in Tokyo
Railway stations in Japan opened in 1931
Itsukaichi Line
Stations of East Japan Railway Company
Fussa, Tokyo